Share is a Caribbean Canadian and Black Canadian community newspaper, based in Toronto, Ontario. Canada's largest ethnic newspaper, Share has two times the circulation of any other Canadian newspaper serving the same ethnic community. It is distributed free of charge in many locations, particularly in the Greater Toronto Area.

The weekly publication, on quarter-folded, tabloid-sized newsprint, includes news from the Caribbean and Africa, sports, entertainment, business, religion, analysis, and commentaries from its community's point of view.

Arnold Auguste is the newspaper's publisher. Founded in April 1978, Share is owned by Arnold A. Auguste Associates Limited.

External links
 Share Newspaper

Black Canadian culture in Toronto
Canada–Caribbean relations
Caribbean-Canadian culture in Ontario
Newspapers published in Toronto
Multicultural and ethnic newspapers published in Canada
Publications established in 1978
Weekly newspapers published in Ontario
1978 establishments in Ontario
Black Canadian organizations